David Merritt Taylor (born October 17, 1949) is a former American football offensive tackle in the National Football League. He was drafted by the Baltimore Colts in the fifth round of the 1973 NFL Draft. He played college football at Catawba and was selected by the Associated Press as a first-team tackle on the 1972 Little All-America college football team.

Taylor graduated from Chapel Hill High School in Chapel Hill, North Carolina.

References

External links
Catawba Football: Taylor went from small school to big-time NFL

1949 births
Living people
People from Statesville, North Carolina
Players of American football from North Carolina
American football offensive tackles
Catawba Indians football players
Baltimore Colts players
Chapel Hill High School (Chapel Hill, North Carolina) alumni